An analgesic drug, also called simply an analgesic (American English), analgaesic (British English), pain reliever, or painkiller, is any member of the group of drugs used to achieve relief from pain (that is, analgesia or pain management). Analgesics are conceptually distinct from anesthetics, which temporarily reduce, and in some instances eliminate, sensation, although analgesia and anesthesia are neurophysiologically overlapping and thus various drugs have both analgesic and anesthetic effects.

Analgesic choice is also determined by the type of pain: For neuropathic pain, traditional analgesics are less effective, and there is often benefit from classes of drugs that are not normally considered analgesics, such as tricyclic antidepressants and anticonvulsants.

Various analgesics, such as many NSAIDs, are available over the counter in most countries, whereas various others are prescription drugs owing to the substantial risks and high chances of overdose, misuse, and addiction in the absence of medical supervision.

Etymology

The word analgesic derives from Greek an- ("without"), álgos ("pain"), and -ikos (forming adjectives). Such drugs were usually known as anodynes before the 20th century.

Classification 
Analgesics are typically classified based on their mechanism of action.

Paracetamol (acetaminophen) 

Paracetamol, also known as acetaminophen or APAP, is a medication used to treat pain and fever. It is typically used for mild to moderate pain. In combination with opioid pain medication, paracetamol is now used for more severe pain such as cancer pain and after surgery. It is typically used either by mouth or rectally but is also available intravenously. Effects last between two and four hours. Paracetamol is classified as a mild analgesic. Paracetamol is generally safe at recommended doses.

NSAIDs

Nonsteroidal anti-inflammatory drugs (usually abbreviated to NSAIDs), are a drug class that groups together drugs that decrease pain and lower fever, and, in higher doses, decrease inflammation. The most prominent members of this group of drugs, aspirin, ibuprofen and naproxen, are all available over the counter in most countries.

COX-2 inhibitors 

These drugs have been derived from NSAIDs. The cyclooxygenase enzyme inhibited by NSAIDs was discovered to have at least two different versions: COX1 and COX2. Research suggested most of the adverse effects of NSAIDs to be mediated by blocking the COX1 (constitutive) enzyme, with the analgesic effects being mediated by the COX2 (inducible) enzyme. Thus, the COX2 inhibitors were developed to inhibit only the COX2 enzyme (traditional NSAIDs block both versions in general). These drugs (such as rofecoxib, celecoxib, and etoricoxib) are equally effective analgesics when compared with NSAIDs, but cause less gastrointestinal hemorrhage in particular.

After widespread adoption of the COX-2 inhibitors, it was discovered that most of the drugs in this class increase the risk of cardiovascular events by 40% on average. This led to the withdrawal of rofecoxib and valdecoxib, and warnings on others. Etoricoxib seems relatively safe, with the risk of thrombotic events similar to that of non-coxib NSAID diclofenac.

Opioids 

Morphine, the archetypal opioid, and other opioids (e.g., codeine, oxycodone, hydrocodone, dihydromorphine, pethidine) all exert a similar influence on the cerebral opioid receptor system. Buprenorphine is a partial agonist of the μ-opioid receptor, and tramadol is a serotonin norepinephrine reuptake inhibitor (SNRI) with weak μ-opioid receptor agonist properties. Tramadol is structurally closer to venlafaxine than to codeine and delivers analgesia by not only delivering "opioid-like" effects (through mild agonism of the mu receptor) but also by acting as a weak but fast-acting serotonin releasing agent and norepinephrine reuptake inhibitor. Tapentadol, with some structural similarities to tramadol, presents what is believed to be a novel drug working through two (and possibly three) different modes of action in the fashion of both a traditional opioid and as an SNRI. The effects of serotonin and norepinephrine on pain, while not completely understood, have had causal links established and drugs in the SNRI class are commonly used in conjunction with opioids (especially tapentadol and tramadol) with greater success in pain relief.

Dosing of all opioids may be limited by opioid toxicity (confusion, respiratory depression, myoclonic jerks and pinpoint pupils), seizures (tramadol), but opioid-tolerant individuals usually have higher dose ceilings than patients without tolerance.
Opioids, while very effective analgesics, may have some unpleasant side-effects. Patients starting morphine may experience nausea and vomiting (generally relieved by a short course of antiemetics such as phenergan). Pruritus (itching) may require switching to a different opioid. Constipation occurs in almost all patients on opioids, and laxatives (lactulose, macrogol-containing or co-danthramer) are typically co-prescribed.

When used appropriately, opioids and other central analgesics are safe and effective; however, risks such as addiction and the body's becoming used to the drug (tolerance) can occur. The effect of tolerance means that frequent use of the drug may result in its diminished effect. When safe to do so, the dosage may need to be increased to maintain effectiveness against tolerance, which may be of particular concern regarding patients with chronic pain and requiring an analgesic over long periods. Opioid tolerance is often addressed with opioid rotation therapy in which a patient is routinely switched between two or more non-cross-tolerant opioid medications in order to prevent exceeding safe dosages in the attempt to achieve an adequate analgesic effect.

Opioid tolerance should not be confused with opioid-induced hyperalgesia. The symptoms of these two conditions can appear very similar but the mechanism of action is different. Opioid-induced hyperalgesia is when exposure to opioids increases the sensation of pain (hyperalgesia) and can even make non-painful stimuli painful (allodynia).

Alcohol

Alcohol has biological, mental, and social effects which influence the consequences of using alcohol for pain. Moderate use of alcohol can lessen certain types of pain in certain circumstances.

The majority of its analgesic effects come from antagonizing NMDA receptors, similarly to ketamine, thus decreasing the activity of the primary excitatory (signal boosting) neurotransmitter, glutamate. It also functions as an analgesic to a lesser degree by increasing the activity of the primary inhibitory (signal reducing) neurotransmitter, GABA.

Attempting to use alcohol to treat pain has also been observed to lead to negative outcomes including excessive drinking and alcohol use disorder.

Cannabis

Medical cannabis, or medical marijuana, refers to cannabis or its cannabinoids used to treat disease or improve symptoms. There is evidence suggesting that cannabis can be used to treat chronic pain and muscle spasms, with some trials indicating improved relief of neuropathic pain over opioids.

Combinations 

Analgesics are frequently used in combination, such as the paracetamol and codeine preparations found in many non-prescription pain relievers. They can also be found in combination with vasoconstrictor drugs such as pseudoephedrine for sinus-related preparations, or with antihistamine drugs for people with allergies.

While the use of paracetamol, aspirin, ibuprofen, naproxen, and other NSAIDS concurrently with weak to mid-range opiates (up to about the hydrocodone level) has been said to show beneficial synergistic effects by combating pain at multiple sites of action, several combination analgesic products have been shown to have few efficacy benefits when compared to similar doses of their individual components. Moreover, these combination analgesics can often result in significant adverse events, including accidental overdoses, most often due to confusion that arises from the multiple (and often non-acting) components of these combinations.

Alternative medicine
There is some evidence that some treatments using alternative medicine can relieve some types of pain more effectively than placebo. The available research concludes that more research would be necessary to better understand the use of alternative medicine.

Other drugs 
Nefopam—a monoamine reuptake inhibitor, and calcium and sodium channel modulator—is also approved for the treatment of moderate to severe pain in some countries.

Flupirtine is a centrally acting K+ channel opener with weak NMDA antagonist properties. It was used in Europe for moderate to strong pain, as well as its migraine-treating and muscle-relaxant properties. It has no significant anticholinergic properties, and is believed to be devoid of any activity on dopamine, serotonin, or histamine receptors. It is not addictive, and tolerance usually does not develop. However, tolerance may develop in some cases.

Ziconotide, a blocker of potent N‐type voltage‐gated calcium channels, is administered intrathecally for the relief of severe, usually cancer-related pain.

Adjuvants 

Certain drugs that have been introduced for uses other than analgesics are also used in pain management. Both first-generation (such as amitriptyline) and newer antidepressants (such as duloxetine) are used alongside NSAIDs and opioids for pain involving nerve damage and similar problems. Other agents directly potentiate the effects of analgesics, such as using hydroxyzine, promethazine, carisoprodol, or tripelennamine to increase the pain-killing ability of a given dose of opioid analgesic.

Adjuvant analgesics, also called atypical analgesics, include orphenadrine, mexiletine, pregabalin, gabapentin, cyclobenzaprine, hyoscine (scopolamine), and other drugs possessing anticonvulsant, anticholinergic, and/or antispasmodic properties, as well as many other drugs with CNS actions. These drugs are used along with analgesics to modulate and/or modify the action of opioids when used against pain, especially of neuropathic origin.

Dextromethorphan has been noted to slow the development of and reverse tolerance to opioids, as well as to exert additional analgesia by acting upon NMDA receptors, as does ketamine. Some analgesics such as methadone and ketobemidone and perhaps piritramide have intrinsic NMDA action.

High-alcohol liquor, two forms of which were found in the US Pharmacopoeia up until 1916 and in common use by physicians well into the 1930s, has been used in the past as an agent for dulling pain, due to the CNS depressant effects of ethyl alcohol, a notable example being the American Civil War. However, the ability of alcohol to relieve severe pain is likely inferior to many analgesics used today (e.g., morphine, codeine). As such, in general, the idea of alcohol for analgesia is considered a primitive practice in virtually all industrialized countries today.

The anticonvulsant carbamazepine is used to treat neuropathic pain. Similarly, the gabapentinoids gabapentin and pregabalin are prescribed for neuropathic pain, and phenibut is available without prescription. Gabapentinoids work as α2δ-subunit blockers of voltage-gated calcium channels, and tend to have other mechanisms of action as well. Gabapentinoids are all anticonvulsants, which are most commonly used for neuropathic pain, as their mechanism of action tends to inhibit pain sensation originating from the nervous system.

Other uses 

Topical analgesia is generally recommended to avoid systemic side-effects. Painful joints, for example, may be treated with an ibuprofen- or diclofenac-containing gel (The labeling for topical diclofenac has been updated to warn about drug-induced hepatotoxicity.); capsaicin also is used topically. Lidocaine, an anesthetic, and steroids may be injected into joints for longer-term pain relief. Lidocaine is also used for painful mouth sores and to numb areas for dental work and minor medical procedures. In February 2007 the FDA notified consumers and healthcare professionals of the potential hazards of topical anesthetics entering the bloodstream when applied in large doses to the skin without medical supervision. These topical anesthetics contain anesthetic drugs such as lidocaine, tetracaine, benzocaine, and prilocaine in a cream, ointment, or gel.

Uses
Topical nonsteroidal anti-inflammatory drugs provide pain relief in common conditions such as muscle sprains and overuse injuries. Since the side effects are also lesser, topical preparations could be preferred over oral medications in these conditions.

List of drugs with comparison

Research
Some novel and investigational analgesics include subtype-selective voltage-gated sodium channel blockers such as funapide and raxatrigine, as well as multimodal agents such as ralfinamide.

See also 
 Audioanalgesia
 Electroanalgesia
 Pain management
 Patient-controlled analgesia
 Pain in babies
 Congenital analgesia (insensitivity to pain)

References

Citations

Sources 

 .
 .

 
Pain
Opioids
Agnosia